The Radical Faeries are a loosely affiliated worldwide network and countercultural movement seeking to redefine queer consciousness through secular spirituality. Sometimes deemed a form of modern Paganism, the movement also adopts elements from anarchism and environmentalism.

Rejecting hetero-imitation, the Radical Faerie movement began during the 1970s sexual revolution among gay men in the United States. The movement has expanded in tandem with the larger gay rights movement, challenging commercialization and patriarchal aspects of modern LGBTQ+ life while celebrating eclectic constructs and rituals. Faeries tend to be fiercely independent, anti-establishment, and community-focused.

The Radical Faerie movement was founded in California in 1979 by gay activists Harry Hay and Don Kilhefner Influenced by the legacy of the counterculture of the 1960s, they held the first Spiritual Conference for Radical Fairies in Arizona in September 1979. From there, various regional Faerie Circles were formed, and other large rural gatherings organized. Although Kilhefner and a later, pivotal member, Mitch Walker, broke from Hay in 1980, the movement continued to grow, having expanded into an international network soon after the second Faerie gathering in 1980.

Today Radical Faeries embody a wide range of genders, sexual orientations, and identities. Sanctuaries and gatherings are generally open to all, though several gatherings still focus on the particular spiritual experience of man-loving men co-creating temporary autonomous zones. Faerie sanctuaries adapt rural living and environmentally sustainable ways of using modern technologies as part of creative expression. Radical Faerie communities are sometimes inspired by indigenous, native or traditional spiritualities, especially those that incorporate genderqueer sensibilities.

Philosophy and ritual

Hay's biographer Stuart Timmons described the Faeries as a "mixture of a political alternative, a counter-culture, and a spirituality movement." Peter Hennan asserted that the Faeries contained elements of "Marxism, feminism, paganism, Native American and New Age spirituality, anarchism, the mythopoetic men's movement, radical individualism, the therapeutic culture of self-fulfillment and self-actualization, earth-based movements in support of sustainable communities, spiritual solemnity coupled with a camp sensibility, gay liberation and drag."

The Radical Faerie movement was a reaction against the social emptiness that many gay men felt was present both in the heterosexual establishment and the assimilationist gay community. As one Faerie commented, in his opinion mainstream gay culture was "an oppressive parody of straight culture", taking place primarily in bars and not encouraging people to "form bonds or care for each other". In contrast, the Faeries "live their sexuality in a way that is very connected to the earth."

Faeries represent the first spiritual movement to be both "gay centered and gay engendered", where gayness is central to the idea, rather than in addition to, or incidental to a pre-existing spiritual tradition. The Radical Faerie exploration of the "gay spirit" is central, and that it is itself the source of spirituality, wisdom, and initiation. Mitch Walker claims that "because of its indigenous, gay-centered nature, the Radical Faerie movement pioneers a new seriousness about gayness, its depth and potential, thereby heralding a new stage in the meaning of Gay Liberation."

In keeping with hippie, neopagan, and eco-feminist trends of the time, gatherings were held out-of-doors in natural settings. To this end, distinct Radical Faerie communities have created sanctuaries that are "close to the land".

Foundation: 1978–79

The Radical Faerie movement was founded by Harry Hay, and Don Kilhefner in Don Kilhefner's apartment in Los Angeles. Hay was a veteran of gay rights activism, having been a longstanding activist in the Communist Party USA prior to becoming a founding member of the Mattachine Society in 1950. After being publicly exposed as a Marxist in 1953, Hay stepped down from the Society's leadership, shortly before the other founders were forced to resign by more conservative members. Kilhefner was a main member of the Los Angeles branch of the Gay Liberation Front (GLF) and went on to found the Los Angeles LGBT Center which is now the largest in the world. Recognizing the value of explorations similar to the Faeries, Kilhefner hosted workshops called "Gay Voices and Visions" in 1975-1981. Walker stated in 1990 that the idea for a spiritual conference for gay consciousness exploration came out of their deeply inspired meeting when Mitch drove to the desert to visit him. Walker later became a controversial figure because of his passionate devotion to honoring what he saw as the sacred spirit in gayness which intimidated many people. Kilhefner agreed with Walker about Harry Hay's personality exemplifying the failure to address unconscious power issues,  and the two formed Treeroots specifically to address such matters in a new organizational effort. Treeroots to this day continues to sponsor events. Kilhefner resigned from Treeroots in the late 1980s because he disagreed with Walker's insistence that the organizers honestly address their issues with each other while Kilhefner was adamant about keeping his issues private.

Raised into an Amish-Mennonite community, Kilhefner had studied at Howard University where he joined the anti-Vietnam War movement and the Student Nonviolent Coordinating Committee. After university, he spent time in Ethiopia with the Peace Corps before joining the Peace and Freedom Party and becoming a leading figure in the GLF from 1969 to 1971. As the GLF evolved into the L.A. Gay Community Services Center, Kilhefner became its first executive director. As it grew, it sought the support of wealthy gay people to finance its social work and public relations, with Kilhefner being concerned at its increasingly assimilationist stance and taking a leave of absence in 1976. He proceeded to enter into a retreat run by Baba Ram Dass, where he got into an extended conversation with Hay in May 1978.

Kilhefner stated in 2019 that the Radical Faeries came out of conversations between Harry and him beginning in 1973 about "the course of the Gay Liberation movement and what was missing." He continues that the "intellectual and spiritual foundation came out of workshops [he] hosted in 1975-1981 called Gay Voices and Visions."

In Autumn 1978, the therapist Betty Berzon invited Hay, Walker, Burnside and Kilhefner to lead a workshop on "New Breakthroughs in the Nature of How We Perceive Gay Consciousness" at the annual conference of the Gay Academic Union, held at the University of Southern California in Los Angeles. This event convinced Hay and his partner John Burnside that they should leave their home in New Mexico and move to Los Angeles, where they settled into a 1920s house on the eastern edge of Hollywood. The four then decided to organize an outdoor conference at which they could discuss with other gay men ideas regarding gay consciousness and spirituality. Kilhefner identified an ideal location from an advert in The Advocate; the Sri Ram Ashram was a gay-friendly spiritual retreat in the desert near Benson, Arizona, owned by an American named Swami Bill. Hay, Walker, Burnside and Kilhefner visited to check its suitability, and although Hay disliked Bill and didn't want to use the site, Kilhefner insisted.

Their conference, set for Labor Day 1979, was to be called the "Spiritual Conference for Radical Fairies", with the term "Radical Faerie" having been coined by Hay. The term "Radical" was chosen to reflect both political extremity and the idea of "root" or "essence", while the term "Faerie" was chosen in reference both to the immortal animistic spirits of European folklore and to the fact that "fairy" had become a pejorative slang term for gay men. Initially, Hay rejected the term "movement" when discussing the Radical Faeries, considering it to instead be a "way of life" for gay males, and he began referring to it as a "not-movement". In organising the event, Hay handled the political issues, Burnside the logistics and mechanics, Kilhefner the budgetary and administrative side, and Walker was to be its spiritual leader. A flier, written by Kilhefner, advertising the event was released and proclaimed that gays had a place in the "paradigm shift" of the New Age, and quoted Mark Satin and Aleister Crowley alongside Hay; these fliers were sent out to gay and leftist bookstores as well as gay community centres and health food stores.

Around 220 men turned up to the event, despite the fact that the Ashram could only accommodate around 75. Hay gave a welcoming speech in which he outlined his ideas regarding Subject-SUBJECT consciousness, calling on those assembled to "throw off the ugly green frogskin of hetero-imitation to find the shining Faerie prince beneath". Rather than being referred to as "workshops", the events that took place were known as "Faerie circles", and were on such varied subjects as massage, nutrition, local botany, healing energy, the politics of gay enspiritment, English country dancing, and auto-fellatio. Those assembled took part in spontaneous rituals, providing invocations to spirits and performing blessings and chants, with most participants discarding the majority of their clothes, instead wearing feathers, beads, and bells, and decorating themselves in rainbow makeup. Many reported feeling a change of consciousness during the event, which one person there described as "a four day acid trip – without the acid!". On the final night of the gathering, they put together a performance of the Symmetricon, an invention of Burnside's, while Hay gave a farewell speech.

Growth, friction, and split: 1979–80

After Hay and the others returned to Los Angeles, they received messages of thanks from various participants, many of whom asked when the next Faerie gathering would be. Hay decided to found a Faerie circle in Los Angeles that met at their house, which became known as "Faerie Central", devoting half their time to serious discussion and the other half to recreation, in particular English circle dancing. As more joined the circle, they began meeting in West Hollywood's First Presbyterian Church and then the olive grove atop the hill at Barnsdall Park; however they found it difficult to gain the same change of consciousness that had been present at the rural gathering. The group began to discuss what the Faerie movement was developing into; Hay encouraged them to embark on political activism, using Marxism and his Subject-SUBJECT consciousness theory as a framework for bringing about societal change. Others however wanted the movement to focus on spirituality and exploring the psyche, lambasting politics as part of "the straight world". Another issue of contention was over what constituted a "Faery"; Hay had an idealized image of what someone with "gay consciousness" thought and acted like, and turned away some prospective members of the Circle because he disagreed with their views. One prospective member, the gay theatre director John Callaghan, joined the circle in February 1980, but was soon ejected by Hay after he voiced concern about hostility toward heterosexuals among the group.

The second Faerie gathering took place in August 1980 in Estes Park near Boulder, Colorado. Twice as long and almost twice as large as the first, it became known as Faery Woodstock. It also exhibited an increasing influence from the U.S. Pagan movement, as Faeries incorporated elements from Evans' Witchcraft and the Gay Counterculture and Starhawk's The Spiral Dance into their practices.  At that gathering, Dennis Melba'son presented a shawl that he had created with a crocheted depiction of the Northwest European Iron Age deity Cernunnos on it; the shawl became an important symbol of the Faeries, and would be sent from gathering to gathering over subsequent decades. There, Hay publicly revealed the founding trio's desire for the creation of a permanent residential Faerie community, where they could grow their own crops and thus live self-sustainably. This project would involve setting up a non-profit corporation to purchase property under a community land trust with tax-exempt status. They were partly inspired by a pre-existing gay collective in rural Tennessee, Short Mountain. The gathering was also attended by an increasing number of men from outside of America, particularly Canada, but also from Australia, Norway, France and Germany, many of whom returned to their countries of origin to establish Faerie communes, such as the Wellington Boot, Common Ground etc. in Australia.

There was some antagonism between Hay and Walker from the beginning of their venture, due to Walker's concern about addressing unconscious power issues, "the shadow," in his preferred Jungian psychological orientation; Walker saw analytical psychology as central to his world view and believed that it could be utilized to aid the gay movement, whereas Hay was disdainful of it. As the Los Angeles Circle grew, Kilhefner also became annoyed with Hay over the latter's tendency to dominate conversations both in and out of the Circle, as well as his proselytizing attitude. In 1980 Walker, frustrated with Hay's dominating personality, formed the "Faerie Fascist Police" on the outskirts to combat "Faerie fascism" and "power-tripping" within the Faeries. He specifically targeted Hay: "I recruited people to spy on Harry and see when he was manipulating people, so we could undo his undermining of the scene."

At a winter 1980 gathering in southern Oregon designed to discuss acquiring land for a Faerie sanctuary, Walker brought his close friend, Chris Kilbourne, and two other members, Sai and David, brought Ion. Hay, Kilhefner and Burnside were outraged at being challenged with having a closed circle and acted as if Kilbourne and Ion did not exist, a terribly difficult situation for them, especially as ten people were holed-up in a small house in the pouring rain, for six days. Finally, Kilbourne couldn't take the hypocrisy of the three leaders and confronted Harry about the power dynamics within the core circle. In the ensuing conflict, the core circle splintered. Plans for the land sanctuary stalled and a separate circle formed. The core circle made an attempt to reconcile, but at a meeting that came to be known as "Bloody Sunday", Kilhefner quit, accusing Hay and Burnside of "power tripping", along with Walker. Walker and Kilhefner formed a new Los Angeles-based gay spiritual group called Treeroots which promoted a form of rural gay consciousness associated with Jungian psychology and ceremonial magic. However, despite the division among its founders, the Radical Faerie movement continued to grow, largely as a result of its anti-authoritarian structure, with many participants being unaware of the conflict regarding disowned power agendas. Walker and Kilbourne also continued to be involved in Southern California gatherings for many years, occasionally offering workshops on the problem of the Shadow, stirring up controversy due to many participants' difficulty with their message. An effort to exclude Walker and Kilbourne was controversially attempted in the early 1990s and, to this day some individuals including Kilhefner attempt to erase Walker from his pivotal role in the original organizing efforts. Hay himself continued to be welcomed at gatherings, coming to be seen as an elder statesman in some peoples' eyes, and a patronized mascot in others.

Continued growth: 1981–present

The first Faerie gathering in Australia was held in January 1981, at Tony Newman's Whole Earth Dream Farm near Ourimbah (established in 1974), inspired by the reporting of the second Faerie gathering in Colorado by RFD, and held in conjunction with Sydney's Gay Men's Rap, although this first gathering did not generate any ongoing Faerie activity. A subsequent and unconnected Faerie gathering was held on 9–12 April 1982, at Mandala, a gay spiritual commune established near Uki in Northern NSW in 1974 by David Johnstone. This second gathering included Faeries who had attended the second and third gatherings in the United States, and led to continued growth of the Radical Faeries in Australia, and repeated attempts to establish Faerie communes, such as Common Ground (Clarence River Valley), and eventually the ongoing commune Faerieland, near Nimbin, NSW.

Guided by Mica Kindman, Lloyd Fair, Cass Brayton, and Will Roscoe, the San Francisco Faerie Circle had formed a non-profit corporation under the name of NOMENUS (varyingly interpreted as "No Men Us", "No Menace", and "No Menus"), supported by Hay. They raised enough money to put a down payment on some land from a 1983 gathering in Napa, however decided against forming a self-sufficient community, instead choosing to purchase a smaller piece of land that could be stationed by a few caretakers and which could house regular gatherings. In 1987 they purchased Magdalene Farm – an 80-acre property near Grant's Pass, Oregon – from George Jalbert, who had unsuccessfully hoped to establish his own rural gay commune there over the preceding decade.

Throughout the 1980s the Radical Faerie movement had spread out from the United States and had gatherings in Canada, Australia, the United Kingdom, and Italy, as well as Folleterre in France.

Black Leather Wings is an organization for spiritual gay leather folk affiliated with the Radical Faeries. The San Francisco South of Market Leather History Alley includes bronze boot prints that honor 28 people important to the local leather communities, including Mark Thompson, a co-founder of Black Leather Wings, and Alexis Sorel, a Black Leather Wings member.

Sanctuaries and gatherings

Rural land or urban buildings where Faeries come together to live a communal life are called sanctuaries', which may host gatherings from time to time.

Cultural influence
Participants at the 1979 Faerie gathering helped establish the Sisters of Perpetual Indulgence in San Francisco that same year.

In the late 1990s Faeries sustained the New York City Drag March, an activist event held the Friday before the corporate-sponsored NYC Pride March. The Drag March began in 1994 in response to attempts to ban leather and drag during festivities marking the 25th anniversary of the Stonewall riots.

Queer as Folk episode "Stand Up for Ourselves" features a storyline where the characters Emmett and Michael attend a rural gathering to discover their "inner Faerie."

Faeries were a contributing influence to the 2006 John Cameron Mitchell film Shortbus, including the casting of performance artist Justin Vivian Bond.

Taylor Mac invokes "Radical Faerie realness ritual" during performances.

See also

 LGBT themes in mythology
 Religion and LGBT people
 Running Water Farm, site of several Faerie gatherings between 1978 and 1989
 Subject-SUBJECT consciousness, concept proposed by Harry Hay
 Modern pagan views on LGBT people
 Pink capitalism

Bibliography
 . Republished in Thompson (1987).
 
 
 
 
 
 
 Gunny Catell: Rise like a Faerie. Vienna, Eigenverlag, 2015, 
 Gunny Catell: Zuhören. Listen Without Prejudice. Listen To The Earth. Vienna, Eigenverlag, 2019,

Periodicals
 R.F.D., often dubbed the Radical Faerie Digest
 White Crane, a journal of Gay Wisdom & Culture

Notes

References

Works cited

External links
 RadFae, web portal for Faerie-related resources including local circles
 Beginnings of a movement, personal recollections from men involved in early days of the Faeries (and the Sisters)
 Faerie Tales (1992) documentary short by Philippe Roques
 Radical Faeries at the Short Mountain Sanctuary (2006) StoryCorps segment for Nashville Public Radio

 
Radical Faeries members
Hippie movement
LGBT culture
LGBT religious organizations
New Age
Modern pagan organizations based in the United States
Organizations established in 1979
Counterculture
International LGBT organizations
LGBT socialism
Modern pagan organizations established in 1979